The 2011 NRL season consisted of 26 weekly regular season rounds, which began on 11 March and ended on 4 September, followed by four weeks of the finals series culminating in the grand final on 2 October.

Pre-season
Saturday 5 February

Friday 11 February

Saturday 12 February

Sunday 13 February

Friday 18 February

Saturday 19 February

Saturday 26 February
 6:00 pm Warriors v Manly-Warringah Sea Eagles @ North Harbour Stadium, Auckland NZ
 7:30 pm Canterbury Bulldogs v Canberra Raiders @ Scully Park, Tamworth NSW
 7:30 pm Newcastle Knights v Cronulla-Sutherland Sharks @ Olympic Park, Muswellbrook NSW
 7:30 pm Sydney Roosters v Wests Tigers @ Sydney Football Stadium, NSW (Foundation Cup)
 8:00 pm North Queensland Cowboys v Gold Coast Titans @ Barlow Park, Cairns QLD (Stockland Trophy)
 8:00 pm Penrith Panthers 0 v Parramatta Eels 30 @ Penrith Stadium, Penrith NSW (Battle for the West Cup)
 8:30 pm Brisbane Broncos v Melbourne Storm @ Dolphin Oval, Redcliffe QLD

Regular season
Details are correct with the Official NRL site.

Round 1

Source: NRL 2011 Round 1 – RL Project
The attendances for this round totalled beyond 200,000 for the first time to be the highest attended round in NRL history, with 201,247 fans attending.
Luke Burt of the Parramatta Eels reached the milestone of scoring over 1,500 career points, becoming the 14th player to do so.
The New Zealand Warriors hosted their first ever home match outside of Mt Smart Stadium, playing against the Parramatta Eels at Eden Park.
The North Queensland Cowboys defeated the Brisbane Broncos for the first time since 2007.

Round 2

Source: NRL 2011 Round 2 – RL Project
Billy Slater of the Melbourne Storm broke his club's all-time try scoring record, surpassing Matt Geyer with 114 tries.
Preston Campbell of the Gold Coast Titans played his 250th NRL game.
Adam Blair of the Melbourne Storm played his 100th NRL game.

Round 3

Source: NRL 2011 Round 3 – RL Project
The Sydney Roosters played their 2000th premiership match, becoming the first and only club to achieve such a feat.
Todd Payten of the Wests Tigers played his 250th NRL game.
Jeremy Smith of the Cronulla Sharks played his 100th NRL game.
The North Queensland Cowboys defeated the Melbourne Storm for the first time since 2006.

Round 4

Source: NRL 2011 Round 4 – RL Project
Luke Burt of the Parramatta Eels broke his club's all-time try scoring record, surpassing Brett Kenny with 111 tries.
Matt Bowen achieved the milestone of most games played for the North Queensland Cowboys, surpassing Paul Bowman by playing his 204th game.
The Gold Coast Titans became the first of any Gold Coast club to win at Canberra Stadium, after nine previous losses. Canberra's loss was their first in golden point games.

Round 5 – Heritage Round

For the first time since last year's salary cap scandal, the Melbourne Storm occupied top spot on the NRL ladder.
Source: NRL 2011 Round 5 – RL Project

Round 6

Source: NRL 2011 Round 6 – RL Project

Round 7

Source: NRL 2011 Round 7 – RL Project

Round 8

Source: NRL 2011 Round 8 – RL Project

Round 9
No club games were played on 6 May due to the Test Match and City vs Country Origin representative matches being played on that day.

BYE: 8 teams – Canterbury-Bankstown Bulldogs, Parramatta Eels, Penrith Panthers, Cronulla-Sutherland Sharks, South Sydney Rabbitohs, Sydney Roosters, Newcastle Knights, Wests Tigers.
Source: NRL 2011 Round 9 – RL Project
Brett Stewart of the Manly-Warringah Sea Eagles surpassed the milestone of 100 career tries.
Johnathan Thurston of the North Queensland Cowboys became his club's highest point scorer, surpassing Josh Hannay with 883 points.

Round 10

Source: NRL 2011 Round 10 – RL Project
The Canberra Raiders defeated the Melbourne Storm at any Melbourne venue (AAMI Park and Olympic Park Stadium) for the first time since 2000.
The Penrith Panthers defeated the Brisbane Broncos at their home ground for the first time since 2005.
Nathan Merritt scored his 100th try for the South Sydney Rabbitohs.

Round 11

BYE: 6 teams – St George Illawarra Dragons, Brisbane Broncos, Melbourne Storm, North Queensland Cowboys, Manly Sea Eagles, Gold Coast Titans.
Source: NRL 2011 Round 11 – RL Project
Players selected for Game One of the 2011 State of Origin series were unavailable to play NRL matches for this round.
Parramatta defeated Cronulla on its home ground for the first time since 2003, when the Eels thrashed the Sharks 74–4.

Round 12

BYE: 2 teams – New Zealand Warriors, Canberra Raiders
Source: NRL 2011 Round 12 – RL Project
The St George Illawarra Dragons have recorded their longest winning streak, winning 9 games in succession.
Cameron Smith of the Melbourne Storm played his 200th NRL game.
Anthony Watmough of the Manly-Warringah Sea Eagles played his 200th NRL game.

Round 13

Source: NRL 2011 Round 13 – RL Project
Michael Jennings of the Penrith Panthers played his 100th NRL game.
Michael Hodgson of the Canterbury Bankstown Bulldogs played his 200th NRL game.

Round 14

BYE: 6 teams – Cronulla Sharks, Canterbury Bulldogs, Newcastle Knights, Parramatta Eels, South Sydney Rabbitohs, Penrith Panthers.

Source: NRL 2011 Round 14 – RL Project
 Players selected for Game Two of the 2011 State of Origin series were unavailable to play NRL matches for this round.

Round 15

BYE: 2 teams – Sydney Roosters, Canberra Raiders

Source: NRL 2011 Round 15 – RL Project
Scott Prince of the Gold Coast Titans played his 250th NRL game.
The Cronulla-Sutherland Sharks defeated the Canterbury-Bankstown Bulldogs for the first time since 2007.

Round 16 – Women in League Round

After three previous unsuccessful attempts, the Cronulla-Sutherland Sharks won its first game on the Gold Coast against the Gold Coast Titans.
Newcastle defeated the Sydney Roosters on its home ground for the first time since 2001.
Source: NRL 2011 Round 16 – RL Project

Round 17

BYE: 6 teams – New Zealand Warriors, Wests Tigers, Melbourne Storm, North Queensland Cowboys, Manly Sea Eagles, Gold Coast Titans.
Source NRL 2011 Round 17 – RL Project
 Players selected for Game Three of the 2011 State of Origin series were unavailable to play NRL matches for this round.
 The Canberra Raiders defeated the Sydney Roosters at the Sydney Football Stadium for the first time since 1995.

Round 18

BYE: 2 teams – St George Illawarra Dragons, Brisbane Broncos
Source: NRL 2011 Round 18 – RL Project
 In his first game back from retirement, Mat Rogers of the Gold Coast Titans played his 200th NRL game.
 Mitchell Pearce of the Sydney Roosters played his 100th NRL game.
 Colin Best of the Cronulla Sharks scored his 100th NRL try.
 Daniel Tolar of the Newcastle Knights played his 100th NRL game.

Round 19 – Rivalry Round

Source: NRL 2011 Round 19 – RL Project
Nathan Hindmarsh of the Parramatta Eels played his 300th NRL game.
Jason Nightingale of the St George Illawarra Dragons played his 100th NRL game.
For the first time in its history, the Canberra Raiders were held scoreless on their home ground, Canberra Stadium.
For the 3rd time since its inception, Golden Point was played twice on the same day, with both the Rabbitohs-Roosters and the Panthers-Eels matches being forced into Golden Point.

Round 20

Source: NRL 2011 Round 20 – RL Project

Round 21

Source: NRL 2011 Round 21 – RL Project

Round 22

Source: NRL 2011 Round 22 – RL Project
The South Sydney Rabbitohs' 56–6 win over the Parramatta Eels was their biggest ever against them and their largest winning margin since 1980.
Nathan Merritt became the first player since Francis Meli (in 2003) to score 5 tries in a single NRL game.
The Gold Coast Titans became the first Gold Coast club to win at the Sharks' home ground.

Round 23

Source: NRL 2011 Round 23 – RL Project
Broncos' captain Darren Lockyer became the NRL's all-time most capped player, surpassing both Steve Menzies and Terry Lamb by playing his 350th NRL game.

Round 24

Source: NRL 2011 Round 24 – RL Project
Billy Slater of the Melbourne Storm played his 200th NRL game.
The Melbourne Storm broke their club record for most consecutive wins by winning their 12th successive game.
Benji Marshall became the Wests Tigers' highest point scorer, surpassing Brett Hodgson with 797 points.

Round 25

Source: NRL 2011 Round 25 – RL Project
Chris Hicks of the Parramatta Eels played his 200th NRL game.
Alan Tongue of the Canberra Raiders played his final Canberra home game before retiring at the end of the 2011 Season
Glenn Stewart and Adam Blair were sent off in the Manly Sea Eagles–Melbourne Storm game due to a massive brawl that was nicknamed Battle of Brookvale.

Round 26

Source: NRL 2011 Round 26 – RL Project
Akuila Uate of the Newcastle Knights scored four tries against the Rabbitohs to equal the club record for most tries by one player in a match.
Paul Gallen of the Cronulla-Sutherland Sharks played his 200th NRL game.
Alan Tongue of the Canberra Raiders Played his last ever NRL match against the Canterbury Bulldogs.

Finals

Qualifying finals

For the first time since the McIntyre final eight system was implemented, all the top 4 ranked teams won in the first week of the finals.
The Wests Tigers, playing their 300th premiership match, broke their club record for most consecutive wins by winning their 9th successive game.
As well as amassing their highest score in a finals game, the Manly-Warringah Sea Eagles scored the most points in a single half of finals football, coming from 8–0 down at half-time to win 42–8.

Semi finals

For the second time in three seasons Brisbane and St. George Illawarra met in the same stage of the semi-finals. As they did in 2009, the Broncos won the match, albeit in extra time, thus ending the Dragons' coaching career of Wayne Bennett. It was also in exactly the same stage in 2008 when his coaching stint at the Broncos came to an end, at the hands of the Melbourne Storm, in a controversial semi-final. This meant that Bennett is still to win a finals match at Suncorp Stadium.

Preliminary finals

Melbourne became the first minor premier since Parramatta in 2005 to lose a preliminary final. As well as this, it was their first ever loss in a preliminary final.

Grand final

References 

National Rugby League season results
Results